A mythical number is a number used and accepted as deriving from scientific investigation and/or careful selection, but whose origin is unknown and whose basis is unsubstantiated. An example is the number 48 billion, which has often been accepted as the number of dollars per year of identity theft. This number "has appeared in hundreds of news stories, including a New York Times piece" despite the fact that it has been shown repeatedly to be highly inaccurate. The term was coined in 1971 by Max Singer, one of the founders of the Hudson Institute.

The origins of such numbers are akin to those of urban legends and may include (among others):
 misinterpretation of examples 
 extrapolation from apparently similar fields
 especially successful pranks 
 comical results
 guess-estimates by public officials 
 deliberate misinformation

See also
 Confabulation
 Factoid
 For all intents and purposes
 Newspeak
 Noble lie
 Truthiness
 Verisimilitude

References

Bibliography
Online at edwardtufte.com.

Numbers